Microcancilla is a genus of sea snails, marine gastropod mollusks in the subfamily Admetinae of the family Cancellariidae, the nutmeg snails.

Species
Species within the genus Microcancilla include:
 Microcancilla brasiliensis (Verhecken, 1991)
 Microcancilla jonasi de Barros & Petit, 2007
 Microcancilla microscopica (Dall, 1889) 
 Microcancilla phoenix Souza, Pimenta & Miyaji, 2021

References

 Hemmen, J. (2007). Recent Cancellariidae. Annotated and illustrated catalogue of Recent Cancellariidae. Privately published, Wiesbaden. 428 pp.

External links
 Hemmen J. (2007) Recent Cancellariidae. Annotated and illustrated catalogue of Recent Cancellariidae. Privately published, Wiesbaden. 428 pp. [With amendments and corrections taken from Petit R.E. (2012) A critique of, and errata for, Recent Cancellariidae by Jens Hemmen, 2007. Conchologia Ingrata 9: 1-
 Dall, W. H. (1924). Notes on molluscan nomenclature. Proceedings of the Biological Society of Washington. 37: 87-90

Cancellariidae